The National Collegiate Hockey Conference tournament is the conference tournament for the NCHC.  The winner of the tournament received an automatic berth into the NCAA Tournament which has occurred every year the NCHC has been in existence, with the exception of 2011. The tournament is a successor to the CCHA Tournament which was discontinued after the conference dissolved due to the major realignment of ice hockey conferences that culminated in 2013–14.

The inaugural tournament was held in 2014 and included all 8 member teams in a three-round championship.

NCHC Hockey Men's Ice Hockey Tournament champions

Formats
 2014
The NCHC Tournament begins with three-round format featuring all conference teams. The quarterfinals consist of four best-of-three series while all subsequent rounds are single-elimination.

Championship appearances
From 2014–present

By school

By coach

Formation
After the Big Ten announced it was forming a hockey conference beginning with the 2013–14 season several teams from the WCHA decided to break from the conference and form a new contingent. As traditional powers Denver and North Dakota were among the teams leaving the NCHC's invitation to some of the remaining CCHA teams was appealing enough to get two more universities to join, swelling the NCHC's ranks to eight. Eventually all of the CCHA teams joined other conferences prior to 2013–14 necessitating its dissolution.

References

External links
The Official Site of the National Collegiate Hockey Conference